Decaschistia is a genus of flowering plants belonging to the family Malvaceae.

Its native range is India to Western Malesia, Northern Australia.

Species:

Decaschistia affinis 
Decaschistia byrnesii 
Decaschistia crassiuscula 
Decaschistia crotonifolia 
Decaschistia cuddapahensis 
Decaschistia eximia 
Decaschistia ficifolia 
Decaschistia harmandii 
Decaschistia intermedia 
Decaschistia mouretii 
Decaschistia occidentalis 
Decaschistia peninsularis 
Decaschistia rufa 
Decaschistia thorelii 
Decaschistia trilobata

References

Malvoideae
Malvaceae genera